Beyond the Thunder is the second solo album by American guitarist Neal Schon released in 1995. This is his first album in six years on Higher Octave.

Background and writing
Between the time in the early-to-mid-90s that Neal Schon played in the band Hardline and later reformed Journey, he released this album mixing fusion, world music and acoustic rock influences.  Schon collaborated with many old friends including Jonathan Cain and Steve Smith from Journey, and Santana percussionists Chepito Areas and Michael Carabello.

In the liner notes Schon recalls the background on some of the songs including "Send Me an Angel" which is about his wife Dina.  The unique wolf howl sound effects on "Call of the Wild" were created by Schon on guitar after listening to a tape Michael Carabello had recorded on a trip in Alaska.  "Big Moon" contains Journey-esque melodies, as Cain and Schon used the original guitar from the Journey song "I'll Be Alright Without You" for the track's sound.

The track "Deep Forest" originated as an acoustic instrumental Schon would perform live in concert with Hardline.  As he described "I had all these bits and pieces that I had played over the years that I just love. And so "Deep Forest" is a composed version of what I used to do when I was improvising on stage.".  The viola parts of this arrangement were played on keyboard by Schon and according to Cain the first take of the song was used for the album.

As a footnote, the album's liner notes contained a shout-out to Journey's former lead singer Steve Perry when Schon commented "I think Steve Perry is going to like this record."  The comment may have been a response to words in Perry's song "Anyway" from his 1994 album For the Love of Strange Medicine, which recalled his time together with his "brothers" in Journey.  Within one year, Schon and Perry would reunite Journey to release Trial by Fire in 1996.

Track listing
All songs written by Schon & Cain unless noted:
 "Big Moon" (instrumental) – 4:54
 "Bandalero" (instrumental) – 4:47
 "Cool Breeze" (instrumental) – 4:55
 "Zanzibar" (instrumental) – 5:09
 "Send Me an Angel" (instrumental) – 5:06
 "Boulevard of Dreams" (instrumental) – 4:15
 "Espanique" (instrumental) – 4:28
 "Caribbean Blue" (instrumental) – 4:36
 "Someone's Watching Over Me / Iguassa Falls" (instrumental) (Schon) – 5:10
 "Deep Forest" (instrumental) (Schon) – 2:52
 "Call of the Wild" (instrumental) – 5:27

Album credits

Personnel
 Neal Schon - electric, acoustic and synth guitars, string arrangements
 Jonathan Cain - keyboards, string arrangements on "Deep Forest"
 Billy Peterson - bass, string arrangements
 Tony Saunders - bass on "Big Moon", "Cool Breeze", "Boulevard of Dreams"
 Tommy Bradford - drums
 Steve Smith - drums on "Bandalero", "Zanzibar", "Send Me an Angel", "Espanique", "Call of the Wild"
 Jose Areas- percussion on "Espanique"
 Michael Carabello - percussion on "Bandalero", "Espanique"
 John Hernandez - percussion

Production
 Neal Schon  - producer
 Jonathan Cain - producer, engineer, mixer
 Matt Marshall & Dan Selene - executive producers
 Dale Everingham & Thomas Leukens - additional engineering

References
 Liner notes from the album.

1995 albums
Neal Schon albums
Higher Octave albums
Jazz fusion albums by American artists